The Sebeș is a left tributary of the river Olt in Romania. Its source is in the northwestern part of the Făgăraș Mountains. It discharges into the Olt near Sebeșu de Jos.

References

Rivers of Romania
Rivers of Sibiu County